In graph theory, the  hypercube graph  is the graph formed from the vertices and edges of an -dimensional hypercube. For instance, the cube graph  is the graph formed by the 8 vertices and 12 edges of a three-dimensional cube.
 has  vertices,  edges, and is a regular graph with  edges touching each vertex.

The hypercube graph  may also be constructed by creating a vertex for each subset of an -element set, with two vertices adjacent when their subsets differ in a single element, or by creating a vertex for each -digit binary number, with two vertices adjacent when their binary representations differ in a single digit. It is the -fold Cartesian product of the two-vertex complete graph, and may be decomposed into two copies of  connected to each other by a perfect matching.

Hypercube graphs should not be confused with cubic graphs, which are graphs that have exactly three edges touching each vertex.  The only hypercube graph  that is a cubic graph is the cubical graph .

Construction 

The hypercube graph  may be constructed from the family of subsets of a set with  elements, by making a vertex for each possible subset and joining two vertices by an edge whenever the corresponding subsets differ in a single element. Equivalently, it may be constructed using  vertices labeled with -bit binary numbers and connecting two vertices by an edge whenever the Hamming distance of their labels is one. These two constructions are closely related: a binary number may be interpreted as a set (the set of positions where it has a  digit), and two such sets differ in a single element whenever the corresponding two binary numbers have Hamming distance one.

The joining edges form a perfect matching.

More generally the Cartesian product of copies of a complete graph is called a Hamming graph; the hypercube graphs are examples of Hamming graphs.

Examples 
The graph  consists of a single vertex, while  is the complete graph on two vertices.

 is a cycle of length .

The graph  is the 1-skeleton of a cube and is a planar graph with eight vertices and twelve edges.

The graph  is the Levi graph of the Möbius configuration. It is also the knight's graph for a toroidal  chessboard.

Properties

Bipartiteness
Every hypercube graph is bipartite: it can be colored with only two colors. The two colors of this coloring may be found from the subset construction of hypercube graphs, by giving one color to the subsets that have an even number of elements and the other color to the subsets with an odd number of elements.

Hamiltonicity 

Every hypercube  with  has a Hamiltonian cycle, a cycle that visits each vertex exactly once. Additionally, a Hamiltonian path exists between two vertices  and  if and only if they have different colors in a -coloring of the graph. Both facts are easy to prove using the principle of induction on the dimension of the hypercube, and the construction of the hypercube graph by joining two smaller hypercubes with a matching.

Hamiltonicity of the hypercube is tightly related to the theory of Gray codes. More precisely there is a bijective correspondence between the set of -bit cyclic Gray codes and the set of Hamiltonian cycles in the hypercube . An analogous property holds for acyclic n-bit Gray codes and Hamiltonian paths.

A lesser known fact is that every perfect matching in the hypercube extends to a Hamiltonian cycle. The question whether every matching extends to a Hamiltonian cycle remains an open problem.

Other properties 
The hypercube graph  (for ) :
 is the Hasse diagram of a finite Boolean algebra.
 is a median graph. Every median graph is an isometric subgraph of a hypercube, and can be formed as a retraction of a hypercube.
 has more than  perfect matchings. (this is another consequence that follows easily from the inductive construction.)
 is arc transitive and symmetric.  The symmetries of hypercube graphs can be represented as signed permutations.
 contains all the cycles of length  and is thus a bipancyclic graph.
 is a -vertex-connected graph, by Balinski's theorem
 is planar (can be drawn with no crossings) if and only if .
 has exactly  spanning trees.
 has bandwidth exactly .
 has as the eigenvalues of its adjacency matrix the numbers  and as the eigenvalues of its Laplacian matrix the numbers . The th eigenvalue has multiplicity  in both cases.
 has isoperimetric number .

The family  for all  is a Lévy family of graphs

Problems 

The problem of finding the longest path or cycle that is an induced subgraph of a given hypercube graph is known as the snake-in-the-box problem.

Szymanski's conjecture concerns the suitability of a hypercube as a network topology for communications. It states that, no matter how one chooses a permutation connecting each hypercube vertex to another vertex with which it should be connected, there is always a way to connect these pairs of vertices by paths that do not share any directed edge.

See also 

 de Bruijn graph
 Cube-connected cycles
 Fibonacci cube
 Folded cube graph
 Frankl–Rödl graph
 Halved cube graph
 Hypercube internetwork topology
 Partial cube

Notes

References 
 .

Parametric families of graphs
Regular graphs